Angie Jones is a software developer. She is also the CEO of Diva Chix.

Early life and education
Angie Jones was born in New Orleans, Louisiana. She attended Marion Abramson Senior High School in New Orleans, LA. After graduating from high school, she enrolled as a Business major at Tennessee State University. However, after taking an introductory C++ course which sparked her interest in tech, she changed her major to Computer Science. She has a Bachelor of Science in Computer Science from Tennessee State University. In 2010, she obtained a Master's Degree in Computer Science from North Carolina State University

Career
Angie Jones began her career in 2003 at IBM in Research Triangle Park, North Carolina where she worked as a software engineer for 9 years.

In 2007, Jones became the CEO of Diva Chix, an online fashion game "where teenage girls and women learn to excel in technological areas as well as learn other key life lessons such as running a business and working as a team, while competing in fashion battles". The game is still active and Jones remains the CEO and sole developer.

In 2014, she became an adjunct professor at Durham Technical Community College where she taught Java programming courses until 2017.

In 2015, she joined LexisNexis as a Consulting Automation Engineer.

In 2016, she began speaking at software conferences around the world and became an international keynote speaker in 2017.

In 2017, she moved to California to work for Twitter as a Senior Automation Engineer.

In 2018, Jones joined Applitools, an AI-powered visual testing and monitoring platform, to start their Developer Relations initiative. As part of her role at Applitools, she created Test Automation University, an online platform that provides free courses on programming and test automation subjects taught by herself and other notable industry experts.

In 2021, she joined Block as the Head of Developer Relations for their open source decentralized exchange platform, TBD54566975.

Jones holds 26 patented inventions in the United States of America and Japan.

Jones has authored chapters in multiple software engineering books including The Digital Quality Handbook: Guide for Achieving Continuous Quality in a DevOps Reality, DevOps: Implementing Cultural Change, and 97 Things Every Java Programmer Should Know.

Volunteering
Jones volunteers with Black Girls Code, where she led the Raleigh-Durham Chapter from 2015-2017. Jones also volunteered with TechGirlz where she planned and taught technology workshops for middle-school girls from 2015-2017. Jones is also an active member of Alpha Kappa Alpha sorority where she has served as Vice President and Technology Chairman of her local chapter, Alpha Zeta Omega in Durham, North Carolina.

References

Tennessee State University alumni
North Carolina State University alumni
IBM employees